is a junction railway station in the city of Higashine, Yamagata Prefecture, Japan, operated by East Japan Railway Company (JR East).

Lines
Sakurambo-Higashine Station is served by the Ōu Main Line and the Yamagata Shinkansen. It is located 108.1 kilometers from the terminus of both lines at Fukushima Station.

Station layout
The station has two opposed side platforms and connected to the three-story station building by a footbridge. The station has a Midori no Madoguchi staffed ticket office.

Platforms

History
The station began operation on December 4, 1999 as part of the Yamagata Shinkansen project.

Passenger statistics
In fiscal 2018, the station was used by an average of 1363 passengers daily (boarding passengers only).

Surrounding area
Higashine is in the central part of Yamagata Prefecture, in the Murayama Basin. Sendai City is to the east, Yamagata City to the south, and Tendo City. Higashine abounds with rich nature and hot springs. Three national highways — National Route 13, National Route 48 and National Route 287 — pass nearby. Yamagata Airport is in the city, facilitating traffic for high technology industries in the prefecture, making Higashine a major industrial center.

The eastern view from the station affords a dramatic panorama of snow-capped mountains.

References

External links

 JR East Station information 

Railway stations in Yamagata Prefecture
Stations of East Japan Railway Company
Yamagata Shinkansen
Ōu Main Line
Railway stations in Japan opened in 1999
Higashine, Yamagata